Associação Desportiva Fazendense is a Portuguese sports club from Fazendas de Almeirim.

The men's football team plays in the Honra AF Santarém. The team played on the Portuguese fourth tier, the Terceira Divisão, from 1996 to 2005 and then again in 2007–08. The team also contested the Taça de Portugal.

References

Football clubs in Portugal
Association football clubs established in 1978
1978 establishments in Portugal